= 4shbab =

Arabic-language satellite television station

- Type: Satellite television
- Country: Egypt
- Headquarters: Cairo, Egypt
- Launch date: Spring 2009
- Official website: 4shbab.net

4shbab (Arabic: 4شباب, or فور شباب, "For the Youth") was an Arabic-language satellite television station headquartered in Cairo, Egypt and broadcast out of Bahrain. The station refers to itself as "Islam's own MTV". and it seeks to "provide superior art form and content... to balance conservation and rehabilitation of young people... [and] the promotion of moral and religious values." Dr. Ali Al'omari serves as the chairman of the station, and Ahmed Abu Haiba is the founder and executive director of 4Shbab.

According to a 2009 Associated Press article, the founder of the channel, Ahmed Abu Haiba, said that he opened the station to show that Muslims can be in touch with the contemporary world. One of the programs is Soutak Wasel ("Your Voice is Heard"), nicknamed "Islamic Idol" by Abu Haiba, a program similar to American Idol. Soutak Wasel features all male performers and an audience separated by gender.

The channel's website is no longer functioning.
